William Cruikshank  (1848/9 – 1922) was a British painter and the grand-nephew of George Cruikshank. He studied art at the Royal Scottish Academy in Edinburgh, at the Royal Academy School in London with Frederic Leighton and John Everett Millais, and in Paris at the Atelier Yvon. His last studies were interrupted by the Franco-Prussian War.

Career
 
In 1871, Cruikshank settled in Canada, opened a studio in Toronto  and for twenty-five years was an instructor in the Central Ontario School of Art, later the Ontario College of Art, teaching how to draw from the antique (casts) and from life. He claimed to have been responsible for bring the pen-and-ink technique of Europe to North America. As a major member of the Toronto Art Students' League, he encouraged his students to follow the motto Nulla Dies Sine Linea (No Day without a Line). Eventual Group of Seven founder, J. E. H. MacDonald, would later say that the northern movement and search for a new Canadian art began with the work of Cruikshank and George Agnew Reid.

In 1894 he was elected a member of the Royal Canadian Academy of Arts and acquired a considerable reputation as a portrait and figure painter, and as a painter of Canadian scenes. Some of his paintings are in the National Gallery of Canada and Art Gallery of Ontario. Ploughing, Lower St. Lawrence (c. 1899, Art Gallery of Ontario) reveals his attention to the environment of Canada: it is a landscape subject of habitants in rural Quebec.

Cruikshank and Tom Thomson

It has been suggested that around 1906 or 1907, Tom Thomson took private lessons from Cruikshank at the Ontario College of Art and Design. Only two sources corroborate this however. The first is a single undated note from Cruikshank to professor James Mavor, arranging to bring a "Tomson"  to meet him. Further complicating the matter is that the original class list no longer survives. The second is a letter from H. B. Jackson to Blodwen Davies, writing, "Tom studied from life & the antique in art school. If I remember right Cruikshank was the instructor." Cruikshank was likely Thomson's only art instructor in an art school.

There also are indications in Thomson`s early work that suggest Cruikshank may have been his teacher. Thomson's painting, reputed to be his first oil, Young Man with a Team of Horses, though modest, is said to have caused Cruikshank to tell him, he'd better "keep on". The theme of ploughing Thomson used is found in Cruikshank's Ploughing, Lower St. Lawrence and may indicate Thomson knew the work of Cruikshank. Also, if Thomson had Cruikshank as a teacher, he would have been encouraged by his instructor to carry a pocket sketchbook and obtain constant practice in drawing, and Thomson did fill such sketchbooks with drawings c. 1906.

Gallery

References

Notes

Citations

Literature

External links

William Cruikshank fonds at the National Gallery of Canada

19th-century Scottish painters
Scottish male painters
20th-century Scottish painters
19th-century Canadian painters
Canadian male painters
20th-century Canadian painters
1848 births
1922 deaths
Artists from Dundee
Scottish emigrants to Canada
Royal Scottish Academicians
People from Broughty Ferry
19th-century Canadian male artists
20th-century Canadian male artists
19th-century Scottish male artists
20th-century Scottish male artists
OCAD University administrators
Members of the Royal Canadian Academy of Arts